Tarik Muharemović (born 28 February 2003) is a Bosnian professional footballer who plays as a centre-back for  club Juventus Next Gen. Born in Slovenia, he represents Bosnia and Herzegovina internationally.

Muharemović started his professional career at Wolfsberger AC, playing mainly in its reserve team, before joining Juventus in 2021.

Club career

Early career
Muharemović started playing football at local clubs, Austria Kärnten and Austria Klagenfurt, before joining Wolfsberger AC's youth setup in 2019. He made his professional debut against Red Bull Salzburg on 25 April 2021 at the age of 18.

Juventus
On 11 August 2021, Muharemović moved to Italian side Juventus on a four-year deal. On 12 October, he injured his tibia.

International career
Muharemović was born in Slovenia to parents of Bosnian descent, and moved to Austria at a young age. He represented Bosnia and Herzegovina on various youth levels.

Career statistics

Club

References

2003 births
Living people
Footballers from Ljubljana
Bosnia and Herzegovina footballers
Bosnia and Herzegovina youth international footballers
Bosnia and Herzegovina under-21 international footballers
Slovenian footballers
Slovenian people of Bosnia and Herzegovina descent
Association football central defenders
Wolfsberger AC players
Juventus F.C. players

Austrian Regionalliga players
Austrian Football Bundesliga players

Expatriate footballers in Austria
Expatriate footballers in Italy
Bosnia and Herzegovina expatriate footballers
Slovenian expatriate footballers
Bosnia and Herzegovina expatriate sportspeople in Austria
Bosnia and Herzegovina expatriate sportspeople in Italy
Slovenian expatriate sportspeople in Austria
Slovenian expatriate sportspeople in Italy